Margaret Ann Jay, Baroness Jay of Paddington,  (née Callaghan; born 18 November 1939), is a British politician for the Labour Party and former BBC television producer and presenter.

Background
Her father was James Callaghan, a Labour politician and prime minister, and she was educated at Blackheath High School, Blackheath and Somerville College, Oxford.

Between 1965 and 1977 she held production posts within the BBC, working on current affairs and further education television programmes. She then became a journalist on the BBC's prestigious Panorama programme, and Thames Television's This Week and presented the BBC 2 series Social History of Medicine. She has a strong interest in health issues, notably as a campaigner on HIV and AIDS. She was a founder director of the National Aids Trust in 1987 and is also a patron of Help the Aged.

Between 1994 and 1997, Baroness Jay was the Chairman of the charity Attend (then National Association of Hospital and Community Friends). In 2003, she was elected Vice-President of Attend.

Political career
Jay was appointed a life peer on 29 July 1992 with the title of Baroness Jay of Paddington, of Paddington in the City of Westminster, and acted as an opposition Whip in the House of Lords. Her status as the daughter of a former Prime Minister led to her being nicknamed 'Posh Spice' after her ennoblement. As a peer, in association with the shop workers' union, she led opposition to the liberalisation of Sunday trading hours.

After her party's election victory in May 1997, she became Minister of State for Health in the House of Lords. From 1998 she was Leader of the House of Lords, playing a pivotal role in the major reform that led to the removal of most of its hereditary members. On 11 November 1999 the government's reform bill (House of Lords Act 1999) was given Royal Assent and more than 660 hereditary peers lost their right to sit and vote in the Lords.

She retired from active politics in 2001. Among numerous non-executive roles that she has taken on since retiring from politics, she was a non-executive director of BT Group.

She was co-chair of the cross-party Iraq Commission (along with Tom King and Paddy Ashdown) which was established by the Foreign Policy Centre think-tank and Channel 4. Before her resignation, Jay gave an interview in which she said she attended a "pretty standard grammar school", which was actually Blackheath High School, an independent school. (Although, as Jay herself pointed out, during the period when she attended it was a direct-grant school – that is to say, a state-funded direct grant grammar school.) She drew ridicule when she said she could understand the needs of rural voters because she had a "little cottage" in the country, which turned out to be a £500,000 house in Ireland, and she also had a "substantial property" in the Chilterns.

Personal life

In 1961, Callaghan married fellow journalist Peter Jay, a child of political parents: Douglas Jay, Labour MP and president of the Board of Trade, and Margaret Jay, member of the Greater London Council. Peter Jay was appointed ambassador to the United States by his friend David Owen, Foreign Secretary in her father's government, leading to accusations of nepotism.

While in the United States, she met journalist Carl Bernstein, with whom she had a much-publicised extramarital relationship in 1979. Bernstein's then-wife Nora Ephron fictionalised the story in her novel, Heartburn, in which the character of Thelma is a thinly disguised representation of Jay. Peter Jay then had an affair with their nanny, fathering a child in the process (he originally denied paternity). The Jays divorced in 1986 after 25 years of marriage.

In 1994, she married AIDS specialist Michael Adler  who had been chair of the National AIDS Trust when she was its director. She retained her surname from her first marriage. She has three children: Tamsin, Alice and Patrick.

Arms

References

External links
biographical article, NZ Herald 2005
BBC profile 2001

|-

1939 births
Alumni of Somerville College, Oxford
BBC television presenters
BBC television producers
English people of Irish descent
English people of Jewish descent
Children of prime ministers of the United Kingdom
Life peeresses created by Elizabeth II
Female members of the Cabinet of the United Kingdom
Labour Party (UK) life peers
Leaders of the House of Lords
Living people
Lords Privy Seal
Members of the Privy Council of the United Kingdom
Panorama (British TV programme)
People educated at Blackheath High School
Fellows of Somerville College, Oxford
British women television producers
Daughters of life peers
Women's ministers
Jay